Tegray Rene Scales (born May 10, 1996) is an American football outside linebacker for the Orlando Guardians of the XFL. He played college football at Indiana.

Early years and high school career
Scales attended Colerain High School in Cincinnati, Ohio, and was a three-year football and four year wrestling letterman. Following his senior year at Colerain, Scales was an Associated Press Division I state co-defensive player of the year, Southwest District defensive player of the year and the Greater Miami Conference co-defensive player of the year and was nominated for the 2013 U.S. Army All-American Bowl.

Scales received offers from Minnesota, Boston College, Illinois, Indiana, Louisville, Marshall, Ohio, Oklahoma, West Virginia and Western Michigan. He committed to Indiana on January 19, 2014.

College career
Scales started all 12 games for the Hoosiers as a freshman, recording 46 tackles, 2 sacks, and 3 interceptions. His first interception came against North Texas, while his first sack was on Missouri Tigers' quarterback Maty Mauk, in the Hoosiers first victory against a ranked opponent since 2006. Scales was named Big Ten co-Freshman of the Week for his performance against Missouri.

Following the 2014 season, Scales was named to the 247Sports.com True Freshman All-American Team, the Scout.com 2014 Freshman All-America Second-team, and the BTN.com and 247sports.com All-Big Ten Freshman teams.

Scales was one of a group Hoosier players suspended for the 2015 opener against Southern Illinois for disciplinary reasons, and he was the only member of the group to remain suspended for Indiana's second game against Florida International. Scales was selected as the IU Defensive Player of the Week for his performance in week 3 against Wake Forest. Scales played in 9 of Indiana's 12 regular season games for the 2015 season, as well as played in the 2015 Pinstripe Bowl. He recorded 53 tackles, 3 sacks and 2 interceptions during the regular season.

Scales recorded 123 tackles, 7 sacks and 1 interception for the 2016 season, including being selected as the Foster Farms Bowl Defensive Most Valuable Player in the 2016 Foster Farms Bowl. On November 29, 2016, Scales was named Third-team All-Big Ten by the coaches and Second-team All-Big Ten by the media.

On January 9, 2017, Scales announced that he would return to the Hoosiers for his senior season. On May 17, 2017, Scales was named one of 42 players to the 2017 Lott IMPACT Trophy Watch List.

Professional career

Los Angeles Rams
Scales signed with the Los Angeles Rams as an undrafted free agent on May 2, 2018. He was waived on August 31, 2018.

Indianapolis Colts
On December 18, 2018, Scales was signed to the Indianapolis Colts practice squad. He was released on December 31, 2018.

Pittsburgh Steelers
On January 4, 2019, Scales signed a reserve/future contract with the Pittsburgh Steelers. He was waived on August 31, 2019.

Dallas Renegades
Scales was selected by the Dallas Renegades in the ninth round of the 2020 XFL Draft. He had his contract terminated when the league suspended operations on April 10, 2020.

Tampa Bay Buccaneers
On October 13, 2020, Scales was signed to the Tampa Bay Buccaneers practice squad. He was released on October 27.

Pittsburgh Steelers (second stint)
On November 11, 2020, the Steelers signed Scales to their practice squad. He was elevated to the active roster on December 12 and December 21 for the team's weeks 14 and 15 games against the Buffalo Bills and Cincinnati Bengals, and reverted to the practice squad after each game. He was signed to the active roster on December 26, 2020. He was waived on January 9, 2021, and signed a reserve/futures contract with the team on January 14. He was waived on August 14.

Cleveland Browns 
On August 25, 2021, Scales signed with the Cleveland Browns. Scales was waived by the Browns on August 31, 2021.

Saskatchewan Roughriders 
On November 25, 2021, Scales signed with the Saskatchewan Roughriders of the Canadian Football League (CFL). He spent on the practice roster and was released December 6, 2021.

Cincinnati Bengals
On December 21, 2021, Scales was signed to the Cincinnati Bengals' practice squad.

Pittsburgh Steelers (third stint)
On January 1, 2022, the Steelers signed Scales to their active roster off the Bengals practice squad. On May 10, 2022, Scales was waived by the Steelers.

Houston Gamblers
Scales signed with the Houston Gamblers of the United States Football League (USFL) on May 19, 2022.

Cincinnati Bengals (second stint)
On July 25, 2022, Scales signed with the Cincinnati Bengals. He was waived on August 30, 2022 and signed to the practice squad the next day. He was cut from the practice squad on November 21.

Orlando Guardians
The Orlando Guardians selected Scales in the third round of the 2023 XFL Supplemental Draft on January 1, 2023. He was placed on the reserve list by the team on March 15, 2023.

NFL career statistics

Personal life
Tegray is the son of Herman Scales and Kathy Wilkerson.

References

External links

 Indiana Hoosiers Profile

1996 births
Living people
American football linebackers
Cincinnati Bengals players
Cleveland Browns players
Dallas Renegades players
Houston Gamblers (2022) players
Indiana Hoosiers football players
Indianapolis Colts players
Los Angeles Rams players
Orlando Guardians players
Pittsburgh Steelers players
Players of American football from Cincinnati
Saskatchewan Roughriders players
Tampa Bay Buccaneers players